Kenneth Victor Rudolph (born December 29, 1946) is an American former professional baseball player. A catcher, he appeared in 328 Major League games played between – for the Chicago Cubs, St. Louis Cardinals, San Francisco Giants and Baltimore Orioles.

In 328 games over 9 seasons, Rudolph posted a .213 batting average (158-for-743) with 55 runs, 6 home runs and 64 RBI.

Rudolph is currently the head varsity baseball coach at Arcadia High School (Phoenix, Arizona).

External links

1946 births
Living people
Baltimore Orioles players
Baseball players from California
Baseball players from Illinois
Chicago Cubs players
Lodi Crushers players
Major League Baseball catchers
Quincy Cubs players
St. Louis Cardinals players
San Antonio Missions players
San Francisco Giants players
Springfield Redbirds players
Tacoma Cubs players
Treasure Valley Cubs players
Sportspeople from Rockford, Illinois